The Grace EPs is a boxset of Jeff Buckley recordings released in 2002.  It contained five EPs, two of which, Peyote Radio Theatre and So Real, had previously been promotional only releases. Live from the Bataclan was released prior to this collection.

Track listing
Disc One (Peyote Radio Theatre)

"Mojo Pin"
"Dream Brother" (Nag Champa Mix)
"Kanga-Roo"
Disc Two (So Real a.k.a. Live at Nighttown)
"So Real" (Live)
"Grace" (Live)
"Dream Brother" (Live)
Disc Three (Live from the Bataclan)
"Dream Brother" (Live)
"The Way Young Lovers Do" (Live)
Also includes a short improv of "Ivo" by the Cocteau Twins at about 9:10
"Je n'en connais pas la fin/Hymne à l'amour" (Live)
"Hallelujah" (Live)
Disc Four (The Grace EP)
"Grace"
"Grace" (Live)
"Mojo Pin" (Live)
"Hallelujah" (Live)
"Tongue"
Disc Five (Last Goodbye)
"Last Goodbye" (Edit)
"Mojo Pin" (Live)
"Kanga-Roo"
"Lost Highway" (Live)

References 

Jeff Buckley albums
Compilation albums published posthumously
Albums produced by Andy Wallace (producer)
2002 compilation albums